Patricia Heywood (born 1 August 1931 in Gretna Green, Dumfriesshire, Scotland), is a Scottish character actress who has appeared in stage productions, films and television. She is married to Oliver Neville, the former principal of the Royal Academy of Dramatic Art.

Career
She was one of five children of engineer John David Heywood. She was educated at the Bristol Old Vic Theatre School, transferring to the theatre company afterwards and appearing in their production of Salad Days as Rowena in 1954.  The same year the entire production transferred to the Vaudeville Theatre in London, where it played for five years, a record for a musical at the time.

In 1968 her film debut at the age of 36 was as Juliet's nurse in Franco Zeffirelli's Romeo and Juliet, followed by small roles in Staircase (1969) and Battle of Britain (1969). Her next role was as a maid in the psychodrama Mumsy, Nanny, Sonny and Girly (1970) by Freddie Francis. After that film she was seen (often in supporting roles or short appearances) in comedies, thrillers and horror films. Her other film roles include parts in All the Way Up (1970), Whoever Slew Auntie Roo? (1971), 10 Rillington Place (1971, where she played Ethel Christie, the wife of serial killer John Christie), Young Winston (1971, as Winston Churchill's nurse), Bequest to the Nation (1973), Wish You Were Here (1987, as Lynda's aunt Millie), Young Toscanini (1988), Getting It Right (1989), and Franco Zeffirelli's Sparrow (1993).

In 1978, Heywood played Nelly in the BBC's television production of Emily Brontë's Wuthering Heights. She appeared on the television miniseries Root into Europe. She played Dickon's mother in the 1987 Hallmark Hall of Fame version of The Secret Garden. She was also in the Inspector Morse episode "Second Time Around".

She was nominated for BAFTA Award for Best Actress in a Supporting Role for Romeo and Juliet in 1969.

Filmography

References

External links

1931 births
Living people
Scottish film actresses
People from Dumfries and Galloway
Alumni of Bristol Old Vic Theatre School
Scottish stage actresses
Scottish television actresses
20th-century Scottish actresses